Defending champion Lindsay Davenport and her partner Jana Novotná defeated Alexandra Fusai and Nathalie Tauziat in the final, 6–7, 6–3, 6–2 to win the doubles tennis title at the 1997 WTA Tour Championships.

Davenport and Mary Joe Fernández were the reigning champions, but only Davenport competed that year.

Seeds
Champion seeds are indicated in bold text while text in italics indicates the round in which those seeds were eliminated.

 Gigi Fernández /  Natasha Zvereva (quarterfinals)
 Martina Hingis /  Arantxa Sánchez Vicario (quarterfinals)
 Lindsay Davenport /  Jana Novotná (champions)
 Nicole Arendt /  Manon Bollegraf (semifinals)

Draw

External links
 1997 Chase Championships Doubles Draw

WTA Tour Championships
1997 WTA Tour